Sam Cowen is a South African radio DJ and was co-host of the morning show The Breakfast express weekdays on Johannesburg local radio station 947.

After leaving the breakfast Express, she took over the afternoon slot on 702. After a short stint as host of the afternoon show, she was replaced by Azania. She left radio. 
Cowen co-authored, with Lee van Loggerenberg, The Irreverent Mother's Handbook (Cape Town: Oshun Books, 2009).

In 2014, Cowen completed the 7.5 kilometre swim to Robben Island in what was the coldest recorded water temperature ever for this route for first time swimmers.

References

South African DJs
Living people
Electronic dance music DJs
Year of birth missing (living people)